Sarju Prasad Misra is an Indian politician. He was elected to the Lok Sabha, the lower house of the Parliament of India from the Deoria constituency of Uttar Pradesh as a member of the Indian National Congress.

References

External links 
Official biographical sketch in Parliament of India website

1905 births
Year of death missing
Indian politicians